Fritz von Friedl (born 17 April 1941) is a German-born Austrian film and television actor. He began his career as a child actor in the early 1950s. His father was the Austrian cinematographer Fritz von Friedl, while his younger sister is the actress Loni von Friedl.

He is the father of the actor Christoph von Friedl.

Selected filmography
 1951 The Merry Farmer
 1952 Voices of Spring
 1952 Ideal Woman Sought
 1953 The Last Reserves
 1953 Annaluise and Anton
 1970 The Sex Nest
 1970 Maximilian von Mexiko (TV)
 1974 Karl May
 1975 Permission to Kill
 1985 Red Heat

References

Bibliography 
 Robert Von Dassanowsky. Austrian Cinema: A History. McFarland, 2005.

External links 
 

1941 births
Living people
Austrian male film actors
Austrian male television actors
Male actors from Berlin